Rajni Abbi (born 1962) is an Indian Politician, a leader of Bharatiya Janata Party and a law professor. She was the mayor of Delhi from 2011 to 2012.

Personal life and education
She was born  in 1962 and did her graduation in English literature from Miranda House College. Later she pursued her legal education from Faculty of Law, Delhi University, and was a gold medalist both in LL.B. and LL.M. She completed her Ph.D. in law from Delhi University and has been teaching there since then.

References

1962 births
Living people
Delhi University alumni
Mayors of Delhi
Bharatiya Janata Party politicians from Delhi
Women mayors of places in Delhi
20th-century Indian women politicians
20th-century Indian politicians
20th-century Indian lawyers
20th-century Indian women lawyers
21st-century Indian lawyers
21st-century Indian women lawyers